Rastislav Špirko (born 21 June 1984) is a Slovak professional ice hockey player who currently playing for HK Poprad of the Slovak Extraliga.

Career statistics

Regular season and playoffs

Awards and honors

References

External links
 

1984 births
Slovak ice hockey forwards
HKM Zvolen players
HK Dukla Trenčín players
HC Dynamo Pardubice players
Living people
HC Spartak Moscow players
People from Vrútky
Sportspeople from the Žilina Region
MHC Martin players
HC Slovan Ústečtí Lvi players
HC Lev Poprad players
Avtomobilist Yekaterinburg players
Amur Khabarovsk players
HC Kometa Brno players
HC Nové Zámky players
HK Poprad players
Slovak expatriate ice hockey players in the United States
Slovak expatriate ice hockey players in Russia
Slovak expatriate ice hockey players in the Czech Republic
Slovak expatriate sportspeople in Hungary
Expatriate ice hockey players in Hungary
Debreceni EAC (ice hockey) players